Jon Schofield is an Australian musician (bass guitar, guitar and vocals) who has played in a range of bands from indie rock 1960s inspired band, Grooveyard, to The Coloured Girls (a.k.a. The Messengers) of Paul Kelly & the Coloured Girls.

Biography
Schofield played in Grooveyard from 1982 to 1984, then Chinless Elite in 1985 and with Paul Kelly and the Coloured Girls/ Paul Kelly and the Messengers during Kelly's commercially successful period in the mid to late 1980s.

Schofield has also been involved in production for the Red Eye label producing the debut EP for The Mexican Spitfires, Lupe Velez.

References

General

  Note: [on-line] version established at White Room Electronic Publishing Pty Ltd in 2007 and was expanded from the 2002 edition.

Specific

Year of birth missing (living people)
Living people
Australian bass guitarists